Vikram Bhatnagar is an Indian sport shooter. He won the silver medal in the Men's Double Trap (Pairs) with Rajyavardhan Singh Rathore at the 2006 Commonwealth Games. In this process he was able to score a good score and carried the team to the silver medal. He is an MBA Graduate and has interests in Hotels and Construction as well. His daughter is Sabhyata Bhatnagar and son Vardaan Bhatnagar.

Awards
He won many awards and medals along with Delhi state Rajiv Khel Ratna Award. He won gold medal in the Asian Clay Shooting Championships in September 2006 which held in Singapore from the Indian double trap team. He won silver medal with the team at Asian Games, Doha, Qatar in December 2006. He won the Delhi State Rajiv Khel Ratna Award on 22 August 2007. In 2008 he started the year with a Grand Prix Bronze medal at the Asian Clay shooting Championships in Jaipur. He is the 2008 National Champion at Jaipur with the score of 144/150 + 47/50 = 191/200. He was a part of the Team that won Gold in Asian Clay shooting Championships in Almaty Kazakhstan in September 2009. He won gold medal in National shotgun championships, Patiala in November 2009. He won the pair Gold in the Commonwealth Games Federation Shooting Championships in February 2010, along with the Bronze in the individual category. At the World Cup in Acapulco, Mexico in March 2010, he placed 4th in the world with a score of 140/150 and 46/50 in the final. His World Ranking as in July 2010 was World No 10, in Men's Double Trap event, making him the highest ranked Indian Shooter in this event.

Other Professional Activities

Vikram Bhatnagar is the President of Precision Shooting Club and is involved in conducting leisure based shooting sports competitions.

Vikram Bhatnagar is the Vice Chairman of Bhatnagar International School, Vasant Kunj, New Delhi

In 2012-13 he was a part of the 5 man committee formed by N.R.A.I that formulated the rules submitted to Ministry of Home Affairs for easing of Arms Licensing and Imports for Renowned Shots, Aspiring Shooters and Junior Shooters. Thus helping in reducing the age of arms ownership for competitive sports to 12 years.

Is an existing member of N.R.A.I Athletes Grievance Committee since 2012 and has contributed towards ensuring discipline in Indian Shooting Sports persons.

In 2014 he has been nominated by President NRAI to oversee the Indo-Bhutan 300m Big Bore event to be held along with the coronation of the King of Bhutan. This sports interchange is under the guidelines of SAARC sports agencies.

References

Indian male sport shooters
Living people
Commonwealth Games silver medallists for India
Trap and double trap shooters
Sport shooters from Delhi
Asian Games medalists in shooting
Shooters at the 2006 Asian Games
Shooters at the 2010 Asian Games
Commonwealth Games medallists in shooting
Asian Games silver medalists for India
Asian Games bronze medalists for India
Medalists at the 2006 Asian Games
Medalists at the 2010 Asian Games
Year of birth missing (living people)
Shooters at the 2006 Commonwealth Games
Medallists at the 2006 Commonwealth Games